Ion Olaru (born 24 August 1961) is a retired Romanian football midfielder.

References

External links

1961 births
Living people
Romanian footballers
CS Universitatea Craiova players
FC Lausanne-Sport players
SR Delémont players
Association football midfielders
Romanian expatriate footballers
Liga I players
Expatriate footballers in Switzerland
Romanian expatriate sportspeople in Switzerland
Swiss Super League players